Joseph Patrick Kennedy (September 6, 1888 – November 18, 1969) was an American businessman, investor, and politician. He is known for his own political prominence as well as that of his children and was the patriarch of the Irish-American Kennedy family, which included President John F. Kennedy, Attorney General and Senator Robert F. Kennedy, and longtime Senator Edward M. "Ted" Kennedy.

Kennedy was born into a political family in East Boston, Massachusetts. He made a large fortune as a stock market and commodity investor and later invested his profits in real estate and a wide range of business industries across the United States. During World War I, he was an assistant general manager of a Boston area Bethlehem Steel shipyard; through that position, he became acquainted with Franklin D. Roosevelt, who was the Assistant Secretary of the Navy. In the 1920s, Kennedy made huge profits by reorganizing and refinancing several Hollywood studios; several acquisitions were ultimately merged into Radio-Keith-Orpheum (RKO) Studios. Kennedy increased his fortune with distribution rights for Scotch whisky. He owned the largest privately owned building in the country, Chicago's Merchandise Mart.

Kennedy was a leading member of the Democratic Party and of the Irish Catholic community. President Roosevelt appointed Kennedy to be the first chairman of the Securities and Exchange Commission (SEC), which he led from 1934 to 1935. Kennedy later directed the Maritime Commission. Kennedy served as the United States Ambassador to the United Kingdom from 1938 to late 1940. With the outbreak of World War II in September 1939, Kennedy was pessimistic about Britain's ability to survive attacks from Nazi Germany. During the Battle of Britain in November 1940, Kennedy publicly suggested, "Democracy is finished in England. It may be here [in the United States]." After a controversy regarding this statement, Kennedy resigned his position.

Kennedy was married to Rose Kennedy and had nine children. During his later life, he was heavily involved in the political careers of his sons. Three of Kennedy's sons attained distinguished political positions: John served as a U.S. senator from Massachusetts and as the 35th president of the United States, Robert served as the U.S. attorney general and as a U.S. senator from New York, and Ted also served as a U.S. senator from Massachusetts.

Background, early life, and education

Joseph Patrick Kennedy was born on September 6, 1888, at 151 Meridian Street in East Boston, Massachusetts. Kennedy was the elder son of Mary Augusta (Hickey) Kennedy and businessman and politician Patrick Joseph "P.J." Kennedy. Kennedy attended Boston Latin School, where he excelled at baseball and was elected class president before graduating in 1908.

Kennedy then attended Harvard College, where he gained admittance to the prestigious Hasty Pudding Club but was not invited to join the Porcellian Club. Kennedy graduated in 1912 with a bachelor's degree in economics.

On October 7, 1914, Kennedy married Rose Fitzgerald, the eldest daughter of Boston Mayor John F. "Honey Fitz" Fitzgerald and Mary Josephine "Josie" Hannon.

Business career
Kennedy pursued a career in business and investing. In his mid to late 20s, he made a large fortune as a stock market and commodity investor; he reinvested in real estate and a wide range of industries. Though he did not build a significant business from scratch, his timing as both buyer and seller was nonetheless excellent.

Various criminals, such as Frank Costello, have boasted they worked with Kennedy in mysterious bootlegging operations during Prohibition. Although his father was in the whisky importation business, scholars dismiss the claims. The most recent and most thorough biographer David Nasaw asserts that no credible evidence has been found to link Kennedy to bootlegging activities. When Fortune magazine published its first list of the richest people in the United States in 1957, it placed Kennedy in the $200–400 million group.

Early ventures

Kennedy's first job after graduating from Harvard was a position as a state-employed bank examiner; this job allowed him to learn a great deal about the banking industry. In 1913, the Columbia Trust Bank, in which his father held a significant share, was under threat of takeover. Kennedy borrowed $45,000 (equivalent to about $ million today) from family and friends and bought back control. At the age of 25, he was rewarded by being elected the bank's president. Kennedy told the press he was "the youngest" bank president in America.

Kennedy emerged as a highly successful entrepreneur who had an eye for value. For example, he was a real estate investor who turned a handsome profit from ownership of Old Colony Realty Associates, Inc., which bought distressed real estate.

Although he was skeptical of American involvement in World War I, Kennedy sought to participate in wartime production as an assistant general manager of Fore River, a major Bethlehem Steel shipyard in Quincy, Massachusetts. There, he oversaw the production of transports and warships. Through this job, he became acquainted with Assistant Secretary of the Navy Franklin Delano Roosevelt.

Wall Street and stock market investments
In 1919, Kennedy joined the prominent stock brokerage firm of Hayden, Stone & Co. where he became an expert dealing in the unregulated stock market of the day, engaging in tactics that were later considered to be insider trading and market manipulation. He happened to be on the corner of Wall and Broad Streets at the moment of the Wall Street bombing on September 16, 1920, and was thrown to the ground by the force of the blast. In 1923, he established his own investment company. Kennedy subsequently became a multi-millionaire as a result of taking "short" positions following the 1929 stock market crash.

1929 Wall Street Crash
Kennedy formed alliances with several other Irish-Catholic investors, including Charles E. Mitchell, Michael J. Meehan, and Bernard Smith. He helped establish a "stock pool" to control trading in the stock of glassmaker Libbey-Owens-Ford. The arrangement drove up the value of the pool operators' holdings in the stock by using insider information and the public's lack of knowledge. Pool operators would bribe journalists to present information in the most advantageous manner. Pool operators tried to corner a stock and drive the price up, or drive the price down with a "bear raid". Kennedy got into a bidding war for control of Yellow Cab Company.

Kennedy later claimed he understood that the rampant stock speculation of the late 1920s would lead to a market crash. Supposedly, he said that he knew it was time to get out of the market when he received stock tips from a shoe-shine boy. Kennedy survived the crash "because he possessed a passion for facts, a complete lack of sentiment and a marvelous sense of timing".

During the Great Depression, Kennedy vastly increased his fortune by investing most of his money in real estate. In 1929, Kennedy's fortune was estimated to be $4 million (equivalent to $ today). By 1935, his wealth had increased to $180 million (equivalent to $ today).

Investments in entertainment, shipping, and real estate

Kennedy made huge profits from reorganizing and refinancing several Hollywood film studios. Film production in the U.S. was much more decentralized than it is today, with many different movie studios producing film product. One small studio was Film Booking Offices of America (or FBO), which specialized in Westerns produced cheaply. Its owner was in financial trouble, and asked Kennedy to help find a new owner. Kennedy formed his own group of investors and bought it for $1.5 million.

In March 1926, Kennedy moved to Hollywood to focus on running film studios. At that time, film studios were permitted to own exhibition companies, which were necessary to get their films on local screens. With that in mind, in a hostile buyout, he acquired the Keith-Albee-Orpheum Theaters Corporation (KAO), which had more than 700 vaudeville theaters across the United States that had begun showing movies. He later purchased another production studio called Pathé Exchange, and merged those two entities with Cecil B. DeMille's Producers Distributing Corporation in March 1927.

In August 1928, he unsuccessfully tried to run First National Pictures. In October 1928, he formally merged his film companies FBO and KAO to form Radio-Keith-Orpheum (RKO) and made a large amount of money in the process. Then, keen to buy the Pantages Theatre chain, which had 63 profitable theaters, Kennedy made an offer of $8 million ($ today). It was declined. He then stopped distributing his movies to Pantages. Still, Alexander Pantages declined to sell. However, when Pantages was later charged and tried for rape, his reputation took a battering, and he accepted Kennedy's revised offer of $3.5 million ($ today). Pantages, who claimed that Kennedy had "set him up", was later found not guilty at a second trial. The girl who had accused Pantages of rape, Eunice Pringle, confessed on her deathbed that Kennedy was the mastermind of the plot to frame Pantages.

Many estimate that Kennedy made over $5 million ($ today) from his investments in Hollywood. During his three-year affair with film star Gloria Swanson, he arranged the financing for her films The Love of Sunya (1927) and the ill-fated Queen Kelly (1928). The duo also used Hollywood's famous "body sculptor", masseuse Sylvia of Hollywood. Their relationship ended when Swanson discovered that an expensive gift from Kennedy had been charged to her account.

As soon as it became legal to do so, Kennedy imported large shipments of high-priced Scotch and made a large profit. Various contradictory "bootlegging" stories circulated but historians have not accepted them. At the start of the Franklin Roosevelt administration in March 1933, Kennedy and future Congressman James Roosevelt II founded Somerset Importers, an entity that acted as the exclusive American agent for Haig & Haig Scotch, Gordon's Dry Gin and Dewar's Scotch. Kennedy kept his Somerset company for years. Kennedy himself drank little alcohol. He so disapproved of what he considered a stereotypical Irish vice that he offered his sons $1,000 not to drink until they turned 21.

Kennedy invested his profits from alcohol into residential and commercial real estate in New York, the Le Pavillon restaurant, and the Hialeah Park Race Track in Hialeah, Florida. In addition, Kennedy purchased spirits-importation rights from Schenley Industries, a firm in Canada. His most important purchase was the largest privately owned building in the country, Chicago's Merchandise Mart.

Political career

SEC Chairman (1934–1935)
In 1932, Kennedy supported Franklin D. Roosevelt in his bid for the presidency. This was his first major involvement in a national political campaign, and he donated, lent, and raised a substantial amount of money for the campaign.

In 1934, Congress established the independent Securities and Exchange Commission to end irresponsible market manipulations and dissemination of false information about securities. Roosevelt's brain trust drew up a list of recommended candidates for the SEC chairmanship. Kennedy headed the list, which stated he was "the best bet for Chairman because of executive ability, knowledge of habits and customs of business to be regulated and ability to moderate different points of view on Commission."

Kennedy sought out the best lawyers available giving him a hard-driving team with a mission for reform. They included William O. Douglas and Abe Fortas, both of whom were later named to the Supreme Court.  The SEC had four missions. First was to restore investor confidence in the securities market, which had collapsed on account of its questionability, and the external threats supposedly posed by anti-business elements in the Roosevelt administration. Second, the SEC had to get rid of penny-ante swindles based on false information, fraudulent devices, and get-rich-quick schemes. Thirdly, and much more important than the frauds, the SEC had to end the million-dollar maneuvers in major corporations, whereby insiders with access to high-quality information about the company knew when to buy or sell their own securities. A crackdown on insider trading was essential. Finally, the SEC had to set up a complex system of registration for all securities sold in America, with a clear set of rules, deadlines and guidelines that all companies had to follow. The main challenge faced by the young lawyers was drafting precise rules. The SEC succeeded in its four missions, as Kennedy reassured the American business community that they would no longer be deceived and taken advantage of by Wall Street. He trumpeted for ordinary investors to return to the market and enable the economy to grow again. Kennedy's reforming work as SEC Chairman was widely praised on all sides, as investors realized the SEC was protecting their interests. He resigned from the SEC in 1935.

Chairman of U.S. Maritime Commission
In 1937, Kennedy became the first Chairman of the U.S. Maritime Commission, which built on his wartime experience in running a major shipyard.

Relationship with Father Charles Coughlin

Father Charles Coughlin, an Irish Canadian priest near Detroit, became the most prominent Roman Catholic spokesman on political and financial issues in the 1930s, with a radio audience that reached millions every week. Having been a strong supporter of Roosevelt since 1932, in 1934 Coughlin broke with the president, who became a bitter opponent and a target of Coughlin's weekly anti-communist, anti-Semitic, far-right, anti–Federal Reserve and isolationist radio talks. Roosevelt sent Kennedy and other prominent Irish Catholics to try to tone down Coughlin.

Coughlin swung his support to Huey Long in 1935 and then to William Lemke's Union Party in 1936. Kennedy strongly supported the New Deal (Father Coughlin believed that the New Deal did not go far enough – indeed that Franklin Roosevelt was a tool of the rich) and reportedly believed as early as 1933 that Coughlin was "becoming a very dangerous proposition" as an opponent of Roosevelt and "an out and out demagogue". In 1936, Kennedy worked with Roosevelt, Bishop Francis Spellman and Cardinal Eugenio Pacelli (later Pope Pius XII) to shut Coughlin down. When Coughlin returned to the air in 1940, Kennedy continued to battle against his influence among Irish Americans.

Despite his public disputes with Coughlin, it has also been acknowledged that Kennedy would also accompany Coughlin whenever the priest visited Roosevelt at Hyde Park. A historian with History News Network also stated that Coughlin was a friend of Kennedy as well. In a Boston Post article of August 16, 1936, Coughlin referred to Kennedy as the "shining star among the dim 'knights' in the [Roosevelt] Administration."

Ambassador to the United Kingdom (1938–1940)

In 1938, Roosevelt appointed Kennedy as the United States ambassador to the Court of St James's (Britain). Kennedy hoped to succeed Roosevelt in the White House in 1940.

Kennedy told a British reporter in late 1939 that he was confident that Roosevelt would "fall" in 1940 (i.e. in that year's presidential election).

Kennedy and his family retreated to the countryside during the bombings of London by German aircraft in World War II. In so doing, he damaged his reputation with the British. This move prompted Randolph Churchill to say, "I thought my daffodils were yellow until I met Joe Kennedy".

High society
According to the US National Archives:<blockquote>In London, the American Ambassador and his wife soared to the heights of British society. In the spring of 1938...the couple luxuriated in the warmth of English hospitality, hobnobbing with aristocrats and royalty at the many balls, dinners, regattas, and derbies of the season. The highlight was surely the April weekend that they spent at Windsor Castle, guests of King George VI and his wife, Queen Elizabeth.<ref>See [https://www.archives.gov/exhibits/eyewitness/html.php?section=20 Eyewitness." ]</ref>  </blockquote>
On May 6, 1944, Kennedy's daughter, Kathleen, married William "Billy" Cavendish, Marquess of Hartington, the elder son of the Duke of Devonshire. The union was disapproved by Rose Kennedy due to Hartington being an Anglican.  Unable to reconcile their religious backgrounds, Hartington and Kathleen were married in a civil ceremony.  Hartington, a major in the Coldstream Guards, was killed in action in 1944.

Appeasement
Kennedy rejected the belief of Winston Churchill that any compromise with Nazi Germany was impossible. Instead, he supported Prime Minister Neville Chamberlain's policy of appeasement. Throughout 1938, while the Nazi persecution of the Jews in Germany intensified, Kennedy attempted to arrange a meeting with Adolf Hitler. Shortly before the Nazi bombing of British cities began in September 1940, Kennedy once again sought a personal meeting with Hitler without the approval of the U.S. Department of State, in order to "bring about a better understanding between the United States and Germany".

Anti-British sentiment
Kennedy also argued strongly against providing military and economic aid to the United Kingdom. "Democracy is finished in England. It may be here", he stated in the Boston Sunday Globe of November 10, 1940. With German troops having overrun Poland, Denmark, Norway, Belgium, the Netherlands, Luxembourg, and France, and with daily bombings of Great Britain, Kennedy unambiguously and repeatedly stated that the war was not about saving democracy from National Socialism (Nazism) or from Fascism. In an interview with two newspaper journalists, Louis M. Lyons of The Boston Globe, and Ralph Coghlan of the St. Louis Post-Dispatch, Kennedy said:

Isolationism
Kennedy's views became inconsistent and increasingly isolationist. British MP Josiah Wedgwood IV, who had himself opposed the British government's earlier appeasement policy, said of Kennedy:

Anti-Semitism
According to Harvey Klemmer, who served as one of Kennedy's embassy aides, Kennedy habitually referred to Jews as "kikes or sheenies". Kennedy allegedly told Klemmer that "[some] individual Jews are all right, Harvey, but as a race they stink. They spoil everything they touch." When Klemmer returned from a trip to Germany and reported the pattern of vandalism and assaults on Jews by Nazis, Kennedy responded, "Well, they brought it on themselves."

On June 13, 1938, Kennedy met in London with Herbert von Dirksen, the German ambassador to the United Kingdom, who claimed upon his return to Berlin that Kennedy had told him that "it was not so much the fact that we want to get rid of the Jews that was so harmful to us, but rather the loud clamor with which we accompanied this purpose. [Kennedy] himself fully understood our Jewish policy." Kennedy's main concern with such violent acts against German Jews as Kristallnacht was that they generated bad publicity in the West for the Nazi regime, a concern that he communicated in a letter to Charles Lindbergh.

Kennedy had a close friendship with Viscountess Astor, and their correspondence is replete with anti-Semitic statements. According to Edward Renehan:

By August 1940, Kennedy worried that a third term for President Roosevelt would mean war. Laurence Leamer in The Kennedy Men: 1901–1963 reports: "Joe believed that Roosevelt, Churchill, the Jews, and their allies would manipulate America into approaching Armageddon." Nevertheless, Kennedy supported Roosevelt's third term in return for Roosevelt's promise to support Joseph Kennedy Jr. in a run for Governor of Massachusetts in 1942. However, even during the darkest months of World War II, Kennedy remained "more wary of" prominent American Jews, such as Associate Justice Felix Frankfurter, than he was of Hitler.

Kennedy told the reporter Joe Dinneen:

Defeatism
Kennedy developed a reputation as a defeatist. During the Battle of Britain in November 1940, he publicly suggested, "Democracy is finished in England. It may be here [in the United States]."

Recall
When the White House read his quotes, it became clear that Kennedy was completely out of step with Roosevelt's policies. Kennedy was recalled from his diplomatic duties and returned to the United States. Roosevelt urgently needed his support to hold the Catholic vote and invited him to spend the night at the White House. Kennedy agreed to make a nationwide radio speech to advocate Roosevelt's reelection. Roosevelt was pleased with the speech because, Nasaw says, it successfully "rallied reluctant Irish Catholic voters to his side, buttressed his claims that he was not going to take the nation into war, and emphasized that he alone had the experience to lead the nation in these difficult times." After Roosevelt was reelected, Kennedy submitted his resignation as ambassador.

Throughout the rest of the war, relations between Kennedy and the Roosevelt Administration remained tense, especially when Joe Jr. vocally opposed President Roosevelt's unprecedented nomination for a third term, which began in 1941. Kennedy may have wanted to run for president himself in 1940 or later. Having effectively removed himself from the national stage, Joe Sr. sat out World War II on the sidelines. Kennedy stayed active in the smaller venues of rallying Irish-American and Roman Catholic Democrats to vote for Roosevelt's re-election for a fourth term in 1944. Former Ambassador Kennedy claimed to be eager to help the war effort, but as a result of his previous gaffes, he was neither trusted nor invited to do so.

Alliances
Kennedy used his wealth and connections to build a national network of supporters that became the base for his sons' political careers. He especially concentrated on Irish-American communities in large cities, particularly Boston, New York, Chicago, Pittsburgh and several New Jersey cities. Kennedy also used Arthur Krock of The New York Times, America's most influential political columnist, for decades as a paid speechwriter and political advisor.

A political conservative (John F. Kennedy once described his father as being to "the right of Herbert Hoover"), Kennedy supported Richard Nixon, who had entered Congress with John in 1947. In 1960, Joseph Kennedy approached Nixon, praised his anti-Communism, and said "Dick, if my boy can't make it, I'm for you" for the presidential election that year.

Alliance with Senator Joseph McCarthy
Kennedy's close ties with Republican Senator Joseph McCarthy strengthened his family's position among Irish Catholics, but weakened it among liberals who strongly opposed McCarthy. Even before McCarthy became famous in 1950, Kennedy had forged close ties with the Republican Senator. Kennedy often brought him to his family compound at Hyannis Port as a weekend house guest in the late 1940s. McCarthy at one point dated Patricia Kennedy.

When McCarthy became a dominant voice of anti-Communism starting in 1950, Kennedy contributed thousands of dollars to McCarthy, and became one of his major supporters. In the Senate race of 1952, Kennedy apparently worked a deal so that McCarthy, a Republican, would not make campaign speeches for the Republican ticket in Massachusetts. In return, Congressman John F. Kennedy, running for the Senate seat, would not give any anti-McCarthy speeches that his liberal supporters wanted to hear.

At Kennedy's urging in 1953, McCarthy hired Robert F. Kennedy (aged 27) as a senior staff member of the Senate's investigations subcommittee, which McCarthy chaired. In 1954, when the Senate was threatening to condemn McCarthy, Senator John Kennedy faced a dilemma. "How could I demand that Joe McCarthy be censured for things he did when my own brother was on his staff?" asked JFK.

By 1954, Robert F. Kennedy and McCarthy's chief aide Roy Cohn had fallen out with each other, and Robert no longer worked for McCarthy. John Kennedy had a speech drafted calling for the censure of McCarthy, but never delivered it. When the Senate voted to censure McCarthy on December 2, 1954, Senator Kennedy was in a hospital and never indicated how he would cast his vote. Joe Kennedy strongly supported McCarthy to the end.

Involvement in sons' political careers
Kennedy's connections and influence were turned into political capital for the political campaigns of sons John, Robert and Ted.

Kennedy had been consigned to the political shadows after his remarks during World War II ("Democracy is finished"), and he remained an intensely controversial figure among U.S. citizens because of his suspect business credentials, his Roman Catholicism, his opposition to Roosevelt's foreign policy, and his support for Joseph McCarthy. Although his own ambitions to achieve the White House were thwarted, Kennedy held out great hope for his eldest son, Joseph P. Kennedy Jr., to seek the presidency. However, Joe Jr., who had become a U.S. Navy bomber pilot, was killed over the English Channel in August 1944 while undertaking Operation Anvil. After grieving over his dead son, Joe Sr. turned his attention to his second son, John, for a run for the presidency.

When John F. Kennedy was asked about the level of involvement and influence that his father had held in his razor-thin presidential victory over Richard Nixon, he would joke that on the eve of the election his father had asked him the exact number of votes he would need to win: There was no way he was paying "for a landslide". Kennedy was one of four fathers (the other three being George Tryon Harding, Nathaniel Fillmore, and George Herbert Walker Bush) to live through the entire presidency of a son.

Historian Richard J. Whalen describes Kennedy's influence on John F. Kennedy's policy decisions in his biography of Kennedy. Kennedy was influential in creating the Kennedy Cabinet (which included Robert Kennedy as Attorney General, although he had never argued or tried a case).

Personal life

Joseph and Rose Kennedy had nine children (see table below). Three of the Kennedys' sons attained distinguished political positions: John F. Kennedy (1917–1963) served as a U.S. senator from Massachusetts (1953–1960) and as 35th president of the United States (1961–1963), Robert F. Kennedy (1925–1968) served as Attorney General (1961–1964) and as a U.S. senator from New York (1965–1968), and Edward M. "Ted" Kennedy (1932–2009) served as a U.S. senator from Massachusetts (1962–2009). His eldest son Joseph P. Kennedy Jr. (1915–1944) was groomed to be president but  died on active duty in World War II on a dangerous experimental flying mission over the English Channel. One of the Kennedys' daughters, Eunice Kennedy Shriver, founded the Special Olympics for disabled people, while another, Jean Kennedy Smith, served as U.S. Ambassador to Ireland.

As Kennedy's business success expanded, he and his family kept homes around Boston, New York City, the Cape Cod peninsula, and Palm Beach.

Kennedy engaged in numerous extramarital relationships, including relationships with actresses Gloria Swanson and Marlene Dietrich and with his secretary, Janet DesRosiers Fontaine. His relationship with Swanson, whose personal and business affairs he managed, was an open secret in Hollywood.

Lobotomy of Rosemary Kennedy

When Rosemary Kennedy was 23 years old, doctors told Joseph Kennedy Sr. that a form of psychosurgery known as a lobotomy would help calm her mood swings and stop her occasional violent outbursts. (Accounts of Rosemary's life indicated that she was intellectually disabled, although some have raised questions about the Kennedys' accounts of the nature and scope of her disability.) Rosemary's erratic behavior frustrated her parents; her father was especially worried that she would shame and embarrass the family and damage his political career and that of his other children. Kennedy requested that surgeons perform a lobotomy on Rosemary. The lobotomy took place in November 1941. Kennedy did not inform his wife about the procedure until after it was completed. James W. Watts and Walter Freeman (both of George Washington University School of Medicine) performed the surgery.

The lobotomy was a disaster. It left Rosemary Kennedy permanently incapacitated. Her mental capacity diminished to that of a two-year-old child; she could not walk or speak intelligibly and was incontinent. Following the lobotomy, Rosemary was immediately institutionalized. In 1949, she was relocated to Jefferson, Wisconsin, where she lived for the rest of her life on the grounds of the St. Coletta School for Exceptional Children (formerly known as "St. Coletta Institute for Backward Youth"). Kennedy did not visit his daughter at the institution. In Rosemary: The Hidden Kennedy Daughter, author Kate Clifford Larson stated that Rosemary's lobotomy was hidden from the family for twenty years. In 1961, after Kennedy suffered a stroke that left him unable to speak, his children were made aware of Rosemary's location. The lobotomy did not become public knowledge until 1987. Rosemary Kennedy died from natural causes on January 7, 2005, at the age of 86.

Dr. Bertram S. Brown, director of the National Institute of Mental Health who was previously an aide to President Kennedy, told a Kennedy biographer that Kennedy referred to Rosemary as mentally retarded rather than mentally ill in order to protect his son John's reputation for a presidential run. Brown added that the family's "lack of support for mental illness" was "part of a lifelong family denial of what was really so".Kessler, pp. 252–253.

Illness and death

On December 19, 1961, at the age of 73, Kennedy suffered a stroke. He survived but was left paralyzed on his right side. Thereafter, he suffered from aphasia, which severely affected his ability to speak. He remained mentally alert, regained certain functions with therapy, and began walking with a cane. His speech also showed some improvement. Kennedy began to experience excessive muscular weakness, which eventually required him to use a wheelchair. In 1964, Kennedy was taken to The Institutes for the Achievement of Human Potential in Philadelphia, a medical and rehabilitative center for those who have experienced brain injury.

Kennedy's son Robert was assassinated on June 5, 1968, while running for president. In the aftermath of Robert's death, Kennedy made his last public appearance when he, his wife, and son Ted made a filmed message to the country. He died at home in Hyannis Port the following year on November 18, 1969. He had outlived four of his children. He was buried at Holyhood Cemetery in Brookline, Massachusetts. Kennedy's widow Rose was buried next to him following her death in 1995, as was their daughter Rosemary in 2005.

See also
 Kennedy curse
 Kennedy family

References

Bibliography

 Brinkley, Alvin. Voices of Protest. Vintage, 1983.
 Goodwin, Doris K. The Fitzgeralds and the Kennedys: An American Saga. Simon & Schuster, 1987.
 Hersh, Seymour. The Dark Side of Camelot. Back Bay Books, 1998.
 Kessler, Ronald. The Sins of the Father: Joseph P. Kennedy and the Dynasty He Founded. Warner, 1996
 Leamer, Laurence. The Kennedy Men: 1901–1963. Harper, 2002.
 Logevall, Fredrik. JFK: Coming of Age in the American Century, 1917-1956 (2020) excerpt
 Maier, Thomas. The Kennedys: America's Emerald Kings. Basic Books, 2003.
 Nasaw, David. The Patriarch: The Remarkable Life and Turbulent Times of Joseph P. Kennedy. The Penguin Press, 2012; excerpt
 O'Brien, Michael. John F. Kennedy: A Biography. St Martin's Press, 2005.
 Renehan, Edward. The Kennedys at War: 1937–1945. Doubleday, 2002.
 Renehan, Edward. "Joseph Kennedy and the Jews". History News Network. April 29, 2002.
 Ronald, Susan. The Ambassador: Joseph P. Kennedy at the Court of St. James's 1938-1940 (2021) excerpt
 Schwarz, Ted. Joseph P. Kennedy: The Mogul, the Mob, the Statesman, and the Making of an American Myth. Wiley, 2003.
 
 Whalen, Richard J. The Founding Father: The Story of Joseph P. Kennedy. The New American Library of World Literature, Inc., 1964.

Primary sources
 Smith, Amanda (ed.). Hostage to Fortune: The Letters of Joseph P. Kennedy''. Viking, 2001, the major collection of letters to and from Kennedy

External links
 
 The Kennedys – PBS Special
 FBI files on Joseph P. Kennedy Sr.
 Affair with Marlene Dietrich
 Correspondence with the Secretary of State at the Franklin D. Roosevelt Library
 
 

|-

1888 births
1969 deaths
20th-century American diplomats
20th-century American politicians
20th-century Roman Catholics
Ambassadors of the United States to the United Kingdom
American anti-communists
American bankers
American businesspeople in shipping
American chief executives of financial services companies
American drink distillers
American film producers
American film production company founders
American film studio executives
American financial analysts
American financiers
American investors
American manufacturing businesspeople
American people of Irish descent
American philanthropists
American real estate businesspeople
American retail chief executives
American steel industry businesspeople
American stock traders
Antisemitism in the United States
Bethlehem Steel people
Boston Latin School alumni
Burials at Holyhood Cemetery (Brookline)
Businesspeople from Boston
Catholics from Massachusetts
Fathers of presidents of the United States
Federal Maritime Commission members
Franklin D. Roosevelt administration personnel
Harvard University alumni
Irish-American history
Joseph P
Knights of Malta
Massachusetts Democrats
McCarthyism
Members of the U.S. Securities and Exchange Commission
Non-interventionism
Politicians from Boston